Battling Bates is a 1923 American silent Western film directed by Webster Cullison and starring Edmund Cobb, Florence Gilbert and Ashton Dearholt.

Plot
Fred Porter is U.S. Secret Service agent on the trail of a gang of outlaws.

Entering a cattle community as a stranger, Porter rescues a young rancher from an ambush.  It seems that a jealous woman, rejected by the ranger who has been wooing another in town, has sent her henchmen out to kill him.

The culprits happen to be members of the same gang that Porter has been tracking.

Cast
 Edmund Cobb as Fred Porter
 Florence Gilbert
 Ashton Dearholt

References

External links
 

1923 films
1923 Western (genre) films
Films directed by Webster Cullison
Arrow Film Corporation films
Silent American Western (genre) films
1920s English-language films
1920s American films